Michael D. Thibodeau (born July 16, 1966) is an American politician and businessman from Maine.  He was a Republican State Senator from Maine's 23rd District, representing all of Waldo County. He graduated from Hampden Academy in 1984. He was first elected to the Maine State Senate in 2010 after serving from 2006 to 2010 as state representative. He also served on the board of selectmen of Winterport.

Career
In 2006, Thibodeau defeated Winterport Charter Commissioner Donna Gilbert after Rep. Jeffrey Kaelin withdrew. He ran as a Clean Elections candidate.

In 2008, Thibodeau, running as an incumbent, was narrowly re-elected over Seth Yentes after spending nearly $10,000 of his own money and over $13,000 overall on his re-election campaign.

An outspoken critic of same-sex marriage in Maine, Thibodeau voted against a 2009 bill to legalize it, saying "Let’s be honest. This isn’t about civil rights. It’s about a social agenda that tears at the very fabric of our society".

In 2010, Thibodeau sought District 23 in the Maine Senate, where he sought to replace fellow Republican Carol Weston. Running as a clean elections candidate, defeated fellow state representative and former House Majority Leader John Piotti with 54% of the vote in the two-way race.

In 2012, he successfully sought re-election. Following the election, which featured Republicans losing control of both the state senate and house of representatives, Thibodeau was named Republican minority leader of the Maine Senate.

Thibodeau announced on December 3, 2013, that he was considering entering the 2014 Second District congressional race.

Upon his party obtaining the majority in the November 4, 2014 legislative elections, Thibodeau was chosen to be Senate President when the new legislative session begins on December 3, 2014.

Thibodeau was reelected Senate President after his party held their majority, albeit a two-seat loss to the Democrats.

On October 17, 2017, Thibodeau announced his run for the 2018 Maine gubernatorial election.

On March 26, 2018, it was announced that Thibodeau had withdrawn from the 2018 Maine Gubernatorial Election.

References

|-

|-

|-

1966 births
21st-century American politicians
Businesspeople from Maine
Living people
Republican Party members of the Maine House of Representatives
Minority leaders of the Maine Senate
People from Winterport, Maine
Hampden Academy alumni